The Uzbekistan passport, being the property of the Republic of Uzbekistan, is issued to the citizens of Uzbekistan for international travels. An ordinary international passport can be issued to an infant at birth and must be renewed after 2 years, next one for toddlers renewed after 5 years and later every 10 years. The passport could also be changed in case of damage or when the bearer of the passport changed his/her name.

The passport contains 48 pages. Pictures with historical sights of Uzbekistan, watermarks, octagonal pentagram, color-changing paint, moiré effect, metallized security thread, laminated film, as well as an embedded electronic chip is added to the sheets. It is in the Uzbek and English languages.

Since 2010 Uzbekistan has been switching gradually to the green color biometric passport system. The old (non-biometric) passports were invalid since the beginning of 2016 internationally, and until 2018 inside the country. From January 1, 2019, onwards the issuance of present burgundy color international passports had been started. Green color biometric passport was valid for travelling internationally until December 31, 2020. Inside the country it is valid until expired as per the passport expiration date.

Identity information page
The Uzbek passport includes the following data:
 Type ('P' for Passport)     
 Country code ('UZB' for Uzbekistan)
 Passport number
 Surname
 Given Names
 Place of birth
 Father's Name
 Date of birth (in DD-MM-YYYY format, such as 28-07-2019)
 Sex ('M' or 'F')
 Place of Birth
 Date of issue (in DD-MM-YYYY format)
 Date of expiry (in DD-MM-YYYY format, must be renewed every 10 years)
 Authority

Visa requirements

As of 5 January 2021, 25 visa-free countries and 33 visa-on-arrival countries, as a result, ranking the Uzbekistan passport 91st in terms of travel freedom according to the Henley Passport Index. As of April 2022, Uzbekistan ranked 87.

See also 
 Visa requirements for Uzbekistan citizens

References

Uzbekistan
Passport
Pasport